The Legend of Sword and Fairy 4, also known as Sword and Fairy 4 or Chinese Paladin 4, is a xianxia-themed fantasy adventure role-playing video game developed by Taiwanese game company Softstar Entertainment's Shanghai subsidiary. It is the fifth installment in The Legend of Sword and Fairy video game series, and serves as an independent prequel to the third game.

Plot
Yun Tianhe (雲天河), a young man who had been living alone on a mountain peak, was on a regular boar hunting trip when he came across the young woman Han Lingsha (韓菱紗), from a clan of short-lived tomb raiders, attempting to break into his parents' tomb, culminating in the destruction of the tomb, and setting him on a journey alongside Lingsha to the outside world to uncover his parents' past. On the journey, they encountered and befriended the adopted daughter of the magistrate of Shouyang, Liu Mengli (柳梦璃), who seemed to have connections to Tianhe's father, and a skilled and kind swordmaster who trained at Mt. Kunlun's Qionghua School since a young age, Murong Ziying (慕容紫英).

Characters
The names of four playable characters in The Legend of Sword and Fairy 4 came from mineral ores.

Yun Tianhe 
Yun Tianhe (雲天河), who lives alone in the mountains after his parents' death, and knows nothing about the outside world. He decided to go on an adventure after coming across Han Lingsha in his parents' tomb, in order to know about his parents' past, and in the hope of becoming a sword master. He later joined in the Qionghua School with Lingsha, where his parents met and trained two decades ago. Going through all kinds of afflictions after leaving home, Tianhe never change his mind that he can conquer fate and live a life on his own choice. In the end, Tianhe fulfilled his dream, but paid the price of losing sight. The name Tianhe comes from amazonite.

Han Lingsha 
Han Lingsha (韓菱紗) came from a clan living on tomb raiding for generations. She is good at geomancy and break barriers in the tomb. Due to her clan's disturbing the dead, the ghosts were infuriated, which led to the Han people's being short-lived. Thus, Lingsha went on the adventure for finding ways to live longer. She came across Tianhe in his parents' tomb, and persuaded him to go on the journey together. The name Lingsha comes from cinnabar.

Liu Mengli 
Liu Mengli (柳夢璃) is the adopted daughter of the magistrate of Shouyang, whose true identity is the demon king's daughter. Nineteen years ago, She was seriously injured in the war between the Qionghua School and the demon world, and was rescued by Tianhe's father. Later, she was sent to a county magistrate's home, and was raised up there as a human child. To know about the true identity of herself, Mengli joined Tianhe and Lingsha's journey. The name Mengli comes from lapis lazuli.

Murong Ziying 
Murong Ziying (慕容紫英) is the descendant of Yan's royal family. He was a sickly child, so his parents sent him to the Qionghua School to be healthy. Learning sword art at an early age and being intelligent, Ziying became a skilled sword master. He is good at casting sword, and also value maintenance of swords. The name Ziying comes from amethyst.

External links
  Official The Legend of Sword and Fairy website
  Softstar's website
  Official Chinese Paladin Online website

Role-playing video games
Video games set in Imperial China
Chinese-language-only video games
Fantasy video games
4
Video games developed in Taiwan
Video games with isometric graphics
Windows games
Windows-only games
Interquel video games
2007 video games
Single-player video games
Video games based on Chinese mythology